Kelmiküla (Estonian for "Rascal Village" or "Rogue Village") is a subdistrict in the district of Põhja-Tallinn (North Tallinn), Tallinn, the capital of Estonia. It has a population of 1,101.

Gallery

References

Subdistricts of Tallinn